The treaty of Rinsk, concluded on 2 November (O.S.) / 12 November (N.S.) 1655, was a Ducal-Royal Prussian alliance during the Second Northern War. Frederick William I, Elector of Brandenburg and duke of Prussia, and the nobles of Royal Prussia agreed to allow Brandenburgian garrisons in Royal Prussia to defend it against the imminent Swedish invasion. The important towns of Danzig (Gdańsk), Thorn (Toruń) and Elbing (Elbląg) did not participate in the treaty and were not garrisoned by Brandenburgian troops, and except for Danzig surrendered to Sweden. The remainder of Royal Prussia, except for Marienburg (Malbork) was overrun by Sweden and Frederick William I's forces pursued to Königsberg (now Kaliningrad), where he was forced to accept Swedish overlordship in the Treaty of Königsberg in January 1656.

Sources

References

Bibliography

Second Northern War
1655 treaties
Rinsk
Rinsk
17th-century military alliances
1655 in Europe
1655 in Sweden
1655 in the Polish–Lithuanian Commonwealth